Quartetos is a three-disc album released on Clean Feed Records in 2002 by Telectu. It was recorded live between May and December 2001 featuring different collaborators at different jazz festivals.

Track listing
Untitled (disc one) -60:41
Untitled (disc two) -52:26
Untitled (disc three) - 56:30

Personnel
Jorge Lima Barreto – piano, prepared piano
Vitor Rua – 18 string guitar, programming
Tom Chant – Soprano sax
Sunny Murray – drums (disc 1)
Eddie Prévost – drums (disc 2)
Gerry Hemingway – drums (disc 3)

References

2002 live albums
Telectu albums